Shipasbamba is a district in Bongará Province, Peru.

References

External links
Shipasbamba district official website

Districts of the Bongará Province
Districts of the Amazonas Region